KKLO (1410 AM) is a radio station broadcasting talk radio and is the Fox News affiliate for Leavenworth, Kansas and the Kansas City metro area. Licensed to Leavenworth, Kansas, United States. The station is currently owned by R.C. Amer and Karen Amer, through licensee Vision Communications, Incorporated.

External links

KLO
Leavenworth County, Kansas
Talk radio stations in the United States